P. W. Vidanagamage (22 February 1934 – 24 August 2013) was a Sri Lankan cricket umpire. He stood in four Test matches between 1984 and 1987 and 23 ODI games between 1982 and 1991.

See also
 List of Test cricket umpires
 List of One Day International cricket umpires

References

1934 births
2013 deaths
People from Colombo
Sri Lankan Test cricket umpires
Sri Lankan One Day International cricket umpires